The 1986 Ottawa Rough Riders finished the season in 4th place in the East Division with a 3–14–1 record, thereby failing to qualify for the post-season. Head coach Joe Moss was fired after posting a 3–10 record and replaced with Director of Player Personnel Tom Dimitroff on an interim basis.

Offseason

CFL Draft

Preseason

Regular season

Standings

Schedule

Awards and honours

CFL Awards
None

CFL All-Stars
None

References

Ottawa Rough Riders seasons
1986 Canadian Football League season by team